Katharine Tynan (23 January 1859 – 2 April 1931) was an Irish writer, known mainly for her novels and poetry. After her marriage in 1893 to the Trinity College scholar, writer and barrister Henry Albert Hinkson (1865–1919) she usually wrote under the name Katharine Tynan Hinkson, or variations thereof.  Tynan's younger sister Nora O'Mahony (née Tynan, 1866–1954) was also a poet and one of her three children, Pamela Hinkson (1900–1982), was also known as a writer. The Katharine Tynan Road in Belgard, Tallaght is named after her.

Biography
Tynan was born into a small farming family in County Dublin and educated at the Dominican St. Catherine's, a convent school in Drogheda. Her poetry was first published in 1875. She met and became friendly with the poet Gerard Manley Hopkins in 1886. Tynan went on to play a major part in Dublin literary circles, until she married and moved to England; later she lived at Claremorris, County Mayo when her husband was a magistrate from 1914 until 1919.

From June 1885 when they first met until around the time of her marriage in 1893, Tynan was a close associate of and regular correspondent with William Butler Yeats (who may have proposed marriage and been rejected). Tynan was also later a correspondent of Francis Ledwidge. She is said to have written over 100 novels. Her Collected Poems appeared in 1930; she also wrote five autobiographical volumes.

Tynan contributed to many periodicals and magazines such as the Jesuit published Studies, the Dominican published Irish Rosary, Irish Monthly, Hibernia and Dublin University Review.

Tynan died in Wimbledon, London aged 72.

Publications

Louise de la Vallière (1885) poems
Shamrocks (1887)
Ballads & Lyrics (1891)
Irish Love-Songs (1892)
A Cluster of Nuts, Being Sketches Among My Own People (1894)
Cuckoo Songs (1894)
Miracle Plays (1895)
The Land of Mist and Mountain (1895)
The Way of a Maid (1895)
Three Fair Maids, or the Burkes of Derrymore (c.1895) later Illustrated by G. Demain Hammond
An Isle in the Water (1896)
Any Woman (1896)
Oh, What a Plague is Love! (1896)
The Golden Lily (1899)
The Dear Irish Girl (1899)
Her Father's Daughter (1900)
Poems (1901)
A Daughter of the Fields (1901)
A King's Woman (1902)
Love of Sisters (1902)
The Great Captain: A Story of the Days of Sir Walter Raleigh (1902)
The Handsome Quaker, and other Stories (1902)
The Adventures of Carlo (1903) illustrated by E. A. Cubitt
The Luck of the Fairfaxes (1904)
A Daughter of Kings (1905)
Innocencies (1905) poems
For the White Rose (1905)
A Little Book for Mary Gill's Friends (1905)
The Story of Bawn (1906)
The Yellow Domino (1906)
Book of Memory (1906)
Dick Pentreath (1906)
The Cabinet of Irish Literature. (4 volumes) (1906) editor, expansion of work by Charles Read
The Rhymed Life of St Patrick (1907) Illustrated by Lyndsay Symington
Twenty-One poems, selected by W. B. Yeats (Dun Emer Press, 1907)
A Little Book of XXIV Carols (1907)
Father Mathew (1908) biography of Theobald Mathew
Experiences (1908)
A Union of Hearts (1908)
The House of the Crickets (1908)
Ireland (1909)
A Little Book for John O'Mahony's Friends (1909)
The Book of Flowers (1909) with Frances Maitland
Mary Gray (1909)
A Girl of Galway
The Rich Man
A Red, Red Rose (c.1910)
Heart O' Gold or the Little Princess
The Story of Cecelia (1911)
New Poems (1911)
Princess Katharine (1911)
Twenty-five Years: Reminiscences (1913)
Irish Poems (1913)
The Wild Harp (1913) poetry anthology, editor, illustrated by C. M. Watts
A Mesalliance (1913)
A Midsummer Rose (1913)
The Daughter of the Manor (1914) illustrated by John Campbell
A Shameful Inheritance (1914)
The Flower of Peace (1914) poems
Mary Beaudesert, V. S. (1915)
Flower of Youth (1915) poems
The Curse of Castle Eagle (1915)
The House of the Foxes (1915) novel
Joining the colours (1916)
Lord Edward: A Study in Romance (1916)
 The Holy War (Great War Poems) 1916.The Middle Years (1916)Margery Dawe (1916) illustrated by Frank E. WilesLate Songs (1917)Herb O'Grace (1918) poemsThe sad years (1918) tribute to Dora SigersonThe Years of the Shadow (1919)The Honourable Molly (1919)Denys the Dreamer (1920)The Handsome Brandons (1921) Illustrated by G. D. HammondBitha's Wonderful Year (1922)The Wandering Years (1922)Evensong (1922)White Ladies (1922)A Mad Marriage (1922) novelMemories (1924)
 Life in the Occupied Area (1925)The Man from Australia (1925)The Wild Adventure (1927)Twilight Songs (1927)The Face in the Picture (1927)Haroun of London (1927)Pat, the Adventurer (1928)The Respectable Lady (1928)The River (1929)Castle Perilous (1929)The Squire's Sweetheart (1930)Denise the Daughter (1930)Collected Poems (1930)The Admirable Simmons (1930)The Forbidden Way (1931)Philippa's Lover (1931)A Lonely Maid (1931)The Story of Our Lord (1932)The Other Man (1932)An International Marriage (1933)Londonderry Air (1935)The Briar Bush MaidA little radiant girl, illustrated by John CampbellA Passionate PilgrimMaximsThe Poems of Katharine Tynan (1963) edited by Monk GibbonA Girls Song"

Bibliography
 Patrick Braybrook: Some Catholic Novelists: Their Art and Outlook (1931)
 Roger McHugh (ed.): W. B.Yeats, Letters to Katharine Tynan (1953)
 Marilyn Gaddis Rose: Katharine Tynan (Bucknell University Press, 1974) 
 Ann Connerton Fallon: Katharine Tynan (Twayne Publishers, 1979) 
 Anne Ulry Colman, A dictionary of nineteenth-century Irish women poets (1996) 
 Rolf Loeber and Magda Loeber, A guide to Irish fiction 1650–1900 (2006), 1315–1332

References

External links

 
 
 
 
 Joining the Colours, a poem by Katharine Tynan on Wikisource.
 
 Katharine Tynan's profile of Francis Thompson, in The Fortnightly Review
 Katharine Tynan Hinkson Papers, 1885–1929 at Southern Illinois University Carbondale, Special Collections Research Center
 
 
Twenty-one Poems by Katharine Tynan: Selected by W. B. Yeats. Dundrum: Dun Emer Press, 1907. Via HathiTrust.

1859 births
1931 deaths
19th-century Irish people
20th-century Irish women writers
Irish women poets
Irish World War I poets
People from Clondalkin